Catwalk is a 1995 American documentary film by Robert Leacock, following model Christy Turlington during Spring Fashion Week in Milan, Paris and New York City. Despite being filmed in 1993, it premiered in 1995.

Synopsis
The film depicts model Christy Turlington and her friends Naomi Campbell, Yasmin Le Bon, Kate Moss, Helena Christensen, Gail Elliott and Carla Bruni as they jetted between Milan, Paris, and New York City during Spring 1994 Fashion Week. Turlington is featured walking in shows and attending fittings for Chanel, Versace, Dior, Giorgio Armani, Jean Paul Gaultier, Karl Lagerfeld, John Galliano, Anna Sui and finally Isaac Mizrahi. Between shows, Turlington is shown shooting a cover for W, socialising with her friends and attending a photo exhibition for Bruce Weber. In the final scene, Turlington is depicted being drawn by artist Francesco Clemente.

The film was shot in black and white and color and incorporated behind-the-scenes footage of many designers at work, including Lagerfeld, Valentino Garavani, Azzedine Alaia, a young John Galliano, and Gianni Versace four years before his death.

Notable fashion icons
The film features appearances by many well-known and influential people in the fashion industry, including models, fashion photographers and designers.

Designers

 John Galliano
 Valentino Garavani
 Jean-Paul Gaultier
 Isaac Mizrahi
 Karl Lagerfeld
 Giorgio Armani
 Azzedine Alaia
 Gianni Versace

Models

 Helena Christensen
 Naomi Campbell
 Kate Moss
 Yasmin Le Bon
 Gail Elliott
 Cindy Crawford
 Carla Bruni
 Linda Evangelista
 Veronica Webb
 Sarah Murdoch
 Shalom Harlow
 Nadja Auermann
 Nikki Taylor
 Claudia Schiffer
 Yasmeen Ghauri
 Tatjana Patitz
 Stella Tennant

Editors

 Anna Wintour
 Liz Tilberis
 André Leon Talley
 Polly Mellen

Others

 Sharon Stone
 Peter Lindbergh
 Oribe
 Francesco Clemente
 Jaye Davidson
 Arthur Elgort
 RuPaul Charles
 Michael J. Fox

Reception
The film received generally negative reviews. On Rotten Tomatoes, the film has a score of 29% based on reviews from 7 critics. In 1996, The New York Times gave Catwalk a negative review, opining "the film makes it clear that Ms. Turlington is used to being stared at by everyone around her. And these star-struck gazes eventually become more interesting than the model herself, since they reveal the aura of privilege that accompanies great beauty. Nothing Ms. Turlington says, no matter how vapid, is greeted with anything less than giddy admiration. So if she seems self-involved, no wonder."

References

1995 films
Films about modeling
1995 documentary films
1990s English-language films